Bathylagus is a genus of deep-sea smelts, some species of which are noted for having stylophthalmine larvae.

Species
The seven recognized, extant species in this genus are:
 Bathylagus andriashevi Kobyliansky, 1986
 Bathylagus antarcticus Günther, 1878 (Antarctic deepsea smelt)
 Bathylagus euryops Goode & T. H. Bean, 1896 (goiter blacksmelt)
 Bathylagus gracilis Lönnberg, 1905
 Bathylagus niger Kobyliansky, 2006
 Bathylagus pacificus C. H. Gilbert, 1890 (slender blacksmelt)
 Bathylagus tenuis Kobyliansky, 1986

In addition, there exists a species Bathylagus milleri (owlfish) in the deep sea at Monterey Bay Marine Life, Source: also MBARI</ref>

References

External links
 https://www.itis.gov/servlet/SingleRpt/SingleRpt?search_topic=TSN&search_value=162081

 
Ray-finned fish genera
Taxa named by Albert Günther